Louise Wright may refer to:
 Louise Wright (canoeist)
 Louise Wright (activist)
 Louise Wright (illustrator)